William Emmanuel Jordan Dover (born December 14, 1994) is a footballer who plays as a defender for League1 Ontario club Simcoe County Rovers. Born in Canada, he represents Guyana internationally.

Early life
He played youth soccer with Ajax SC.

College career
Dover played four years of college soccer at the University of Wisconsin–Green Bay between 2012 and 2015. He scored his first goal on October 6, 2012 against the Valparaiso Crusaders. He was named to the Horizon League All-Newcomer Team in 2012.

Club career
From 2014 to 2016, he played with Durham United FA in League1 Ontario.

On February 15, 2017, Dover signed a professional contract with the Rochester Rhinos of the USL Championship. Dover would play one season with Rochester, before the club announced they would not play in the 2018 USL season.

On December 19, 2017, Dover signed with USL side Pittsburgh Riverhounds SC. He scored his first professional goal on April 21, 2018 against FC Cincinnati. He re-signed with the club for the 2020 season, with an option for 2021. He made his 100th USL appearance on June 12, 2021 against Miami FC.

After 4 years with Pittsburgh, Dover would sign with League1 Ontario club Simcoe County Rovers.

International career
In May 2019, Dover was named on the Guyana national team's provisional list for the 2019 CONCACAF Gold Cup. He made the final squad on May 30. He made his debut on June 18, 2019 in the game against the United States, as a starter.

References

External links

Jordan Dover Green Bay profile

1994 births
Living people
Canadian soccer players
Canadian sportspeople of Guyanese descent
Black Canadian soccer players
Canadian expatriate soccer players
Guyanese footballers
Guyana international footballers
Guyanese expatriate footballers
Rochester New York FC players
People from Ajax, Ontario
Pittsburgh Riverhounds SC players
Association football defenders
Expatriate soccer players in the United States
USL Championship players
Soccer people from Ontario
Green Bay Phoenix men's soccer players
2019 CONCACAF Gold Cup players
Pickering FC players
Simcoe County Rovers FC players
League1 Ontario players